The Culture, Tourism and Major Events Directorate is a directorate of the Scottish Government that has a responsibility for representing Scotland in other countries as a place of tourism, investment and cultural exchange.

Membership of the directorate

Cabinet secretaries

Current composition of the directorate are: 

 Angus Robertson, Cabinet Secretary for The Constitution, External Affairs and Culture
 Jenny Gilruth, Minister for Culture, Europe and International Development

Directorate management

The management of the directorate consists of: 

 Liz Ditchburn, Director-General of Economy 
 Jonathan Pryce, Director of Culture, Tourism and Major Events

See also

 Scottish Government 
 Directorates of the Scottish Government

References 

Directorates of the Scottish Government